Ramanattukara is a municipality census town in Kozhikode district in the Indian state of Kerala. This town was formerly called Kadungan Chira village. Ramanattukara is located 14 km away from Kozhikode city.

 Developing as a suburb of Kozhikode city, Ramanattukara is a part of the master plan for Kozhikode urban area.

History
Ramanattukara, on the southern bank of Chaliyar river, was adjacent to the kingdom of Parappanad during medieval period. Parappanad royal family is a cousin dynasty of the Travancore royal family. The rulers of Parappanad were vassals to the Zamorin of Calicut. The headquarters of Parappanad Royal family was the coastal town of Parappanangadi in present-day Malappuram district. In 15th century CE, Parappanad Swaroopam was divided into two - Northern Parappanad (Beypore Swaroopam) and Southern Parappanad (Parappur Swaroopam). Beypore, Cheruvannur, and Panniyankara, on northern bank of Chaliyar, became Northern Parappanad. Kadalundi, Vallikkunnu, and Parappanangadi, on the southern bank of Chaliyar became Southern Parappanad.

It is also known the ruler of the Kingdom of Tanur (Vettathunadu Swaroopam), had assisted the Portuguese to build a fort at the island of Chaliyam, which was a part of Southern Parappanad, and was destructed during the Battle at Chaliyam fort occurred in 1571. Feroke became a part of the Kingdom of Mysore in late 18th century CE. Following the Third Anglo-Mysore War and the subsequent Treaty of Seringapatam, Ramanattukara became a part of Malabar District under British Raj. Ramanattukara was included in Eranad Taluk in the Malappuram Revenue Division of Malabar District with its Taluk headquarters at Manjeri. Following the formation of the state of Kerala in 1956, Ramanattukara became a part of Tirurangadi Revenue block of Tirur Taluk. On 16 June 1969, Eranad Taluk, Tirur Taluk, Tirurangadi, and Parappanangadi, were transferred to newly formed Malappuram district. However, three Revenue Villages of Tirur Taluk, namely, Feroke, Ramanattukara, and Kadalundi, remained in Kozhikode district, as they were much closer to Kozhikode city centre. However Kadalundi Nagaram beach (where Kadalundi River flows into Arabian Sea, a part of Vallikkunnu Grama Panchayat), Tenhipalam, the centre of University of Calicut and Karippur, the site of Calicut International Airport, became parts of Malappuram. Feroke, Ramanattukara, and Kadalundi are parts of Kozhikode Taluk and Kozhikode metropolitan area.

Demographics

As of 2011 census, Ramanattukara had a population of 35,937. Males constitute 48.90% of the population and females 51.09%. Ramanattukara has an average literacy rate of 95.95%, higher than the national average of 74.04%: male literacy is 97.71%, and female literacy is 94.21%. In Ramanattukara, 11.46% of the population is under 6 years of age.

 India census, Ramanattukara had a population of 30,436. Males constitute 49% of the population and females 51%. Ramanattukara has an average literacy rate of 83%, higher than the national average of 59.5%: male literacy is 85%, and female literacy is 80%. In Ramanattukara, 12% of the population is under 6 years of age.

Election Results 

Independents won 2 seats and have 1.31% vote share in 2020 election

Political Performance in Election 2015

2010 Ramanattukara Gramapanchayat Elections

Location
Ramanattukara is situated 15 km south of Calicut city. Its location on the intersection of National Highway 66 and National Highway 213 had already given its economy a boost. To top it up, now the NH bypass for Calicut city starts from here.

Education

 Sevamandir spbhss Ramanattukara
 Ramanattukara Higher secondary school vaidyarangadi
 Government U P school Ramanattukara
 Farook arts and science college

Transportation
The nearest railhead to Ramanattukara is Feroke (5 km) and the nearest airport is Calicut International Airport (10 km).

Suburbs of Ramanattukara
 Azhinhilam
 Perumugham and Pullikkadavu
 Chelembra, Puthukode, Irumooliparamba and Karad
 Kottupadam, Kakkov, Channayilpalliyali and Akode
 Virippad, Oorkkadavu and Korappadam
 Mundumuzhi and Valillappuzha
 Kuriyadam and Aikarappady
 Arulippuram, Vaidyarangadi and Pulikkal
 Adivaram, Kuttoolangadi and Koshavarangadi
 EranhikkalRoad, KrishiBhavan, Muttumkunnu and Kokkivalavu
 Kunnampallynagar, Madamthodi and Shanthinagar
 ManthriRoad, HomeoRoad, Poovannurpally and Ette-nalu
Manthrammal road
 Farook College

See also
 Pantheerankave
 Chelembra
 Farook College
 Feroke
 Kadalundi Bird Sanctuary
 Paruthippara
 Cheruvannur

 Idimuzhikkal

 Vazhayur

References

External links

Cities and towns in Kozhikode district
Kozhikode south